Khordeh Avesta, meaning 'little, or lesser, or small Avesta', is the name given to two different collections of Zoroastrian religious texts. One of the two collections includes the other and takes its name from it.

  In a narrow sense, the term applies to a particular manuscript tradition that includes only the five Nyayesh texts, the five Gah texts, the four Afrinagans, and five introductory chapters that consist of quotations from various passages of the Yasna. More generally,  the term may also be applied to Avestan texts other than the lengthy liturgical Yasna, Visperad and Vendidad. The term then also extends to the twenty-one yashts and the thirty Siroza texts, but does not usually encompass the various Avestan language fragments found in other works.
 In the 19th century, when the first Khordeh Avesta editions were printed, the selection of Avesta texts described above (together with some non-Avestan language prayers) became a book of common prayer for lay people. In addition to the texts mentioned above, the published Khordeh Avesta editions also included selections from the Yasna necessary for daily worship, such as the Ahuna Vairya and Ashem Vohu. The selection of texts is not fixed, and so publishers are free to include any text they choose. Several Khordeh Avesta editions are quite comprehensive, and include Pazend prayers, modern devotional compositions such as the poetical or semi-poetical Gujarati monagats, or glossaries and other reference lists such as dates of religious events.

References

Zoroastrian texts